Coso Hot Springs is a hot spring complex in the Coso Volcanic Field in the Mojave Desert of Inyo County, California. The Springs are on the National Register of Historic Places.

Geography
The Coso Hot Springs lie within the boundaries of the Naval Air Weapons Station China Lake (NAWS China Lake), near Little Lake, Inyo County, California and U.S. Route 395. They are near the Coso Mountains, north of Indian Wells Valley and south of the Owens Valley. The hot springs are part of the geothermal activity of the Coso Volcanic Field.

Water profile

History
The springs were a traditional Native American cultural and healing ritual site of the Coso people, and later the Northern Paiute and Timbisha. The site is called Kooso or Muattang Ka in Timbisha. In the 1920s it was a "hot springs resort."  Contemporary local Native American people periodically have ceremonies at the springs.

Coso Hot Springs is the site of one of the largest (if not the largest) assemblages of prehistoric rock art in North America. The areas known as Big and Little Petroglyph Canyons by the hot springs have over 20,000 remarkably undisturbed images in a distinctive so-called Coso style.

See also

Fossil Falls
List of hot springs in the United States
List of hot springs in the world

References

Hot springs of California
Native American history of California
Former Native American populated places in California
History of Inyo County, California
Protected areas of the Mojave Desert
Archaeological sites on the National Register of Historic Places in California
Rustic architecture in California
Bodies of water of Inyo County, California
Historic districts on the National Register of Historic Places in California
National Register of Historic Places in Inyo County, California